The 1934 Chicago White Sox season was the team's 34th season in the major leagues and its 35th season overall. They finished with a record of 53–99, good enough for eighth and last place in the American League (47 games behind the first place Detroit Tigers).

Offseason 
 October 25, 1933: Chad Kimsey and Charlie English were traded by the White Sox to the Montreal Royals for John Pomorski.

Regular season

Season standings

Record vs. opponents

Notable transactions 
 May 9, 1934: Red Kress was traded by the White Sox to the Washington Senators for Bob Boken.
 May 20, 1934: Ed Madjeski was signed as a free agent by the White Sox.
 June 27, 1934: Marty Hopkins was purchased by the White Sox from the St. Paul Saints.
 August 11, 1934: Rip Radcliff was purchased by the White Sox from the Louisville Colonels.

Roster

Player stats

Batting

Starters by position 
Note: Pos = Position; G = Games played; AB = At bats; H = Hits; Avg. = Batting average; HR = Home runs; RBI = Runs batted in

Other batters 
Note: G = Games played; AB = At bats; H = Hits; Avg. = Batting average; HR = Home runs; RBI = Runs batted in

Pitching

Starting pitchers 
Note: G = Games pitched; IP = Innings pitched; W = Wins; L = Losses; ERA = Earned run average; SO = Strikeouts

Other pitchers 
Note: G = Games pitched; IP = Innings pitched; W = Wins; L = Losses; ERA = Earned run average; SO = Strikeouts

Relief pitchers 
Note: G = Games pitched; W = Wins; L = Losses; SV = Saves; ERA = Earned run average; SO = Strikeouts

Farm system

Notes

References 
1934 Chicago White Sox at Baseball Reference

Chicago White Sox seasons
Chicago White Sox season
Chicago White